, sometimes written as tsuritama, is a Japanese anime television series that aired between 13 April 2012 and 28 June 2012. The anime was licensed by Sentai Filmworks in North America, by MVM Films in the United Kingdom, and Hanabee in Australia and New Zealand.

Plot
Yuki Sanada is a high school student who lives with his grandmother Kaito, a woman whose career requires frequent relocation which prevents the boy from establishing any real friendships, much less the social skills necessary to initiate them. Whenever he becomes anxious, he freezes in place, unable to breathe, and feels like he is drowning. During these episodes, he dons a markedly demonic expression—so potent with seemingly latent rage that others become wary of him at its appearance. Shortly after arriving at their home on the grandmother's most recently sanctioned work base, the island of Enoshima, a zealous transfer student named Haru— wielding a water gun and sporting a fish bowl atop his head— appears on their doorstep claiming to be an alien and that he will henceforth be living in the same house; the grandmother agrees to allow such if Haru simply meets one condition (which is undisclosed to the audience). Haru's presence continually makes Yuki uncomfortable. The two also meet a secluded young fisher, Natsuki Usami, nicknamed "The Fishing Prince" and an Indian man named Akira, who watches Haru from a distance with his duck Tapioca.

Characters

Main characters

Yuki has bright red hair, is socially inept and when afraid or nervous, makes a horrible, demonic face. He frequently consults his phone for information on various topics. When put on the spot, he mentally creates a scenario where he is drowning as a reaction to stress. Yuki's a bit afraid of Natsuki, and thinks Haru is very weird and usually tries to avoid him. He lives with his French grandmother, and is fond of the ocean and air in Enoshima. Dragged by Haru to learn to fish against his will, he ends up becoming very fond of it.

Haru has blonde hair, purple eyes and long eyelashes, and is very cheerful and charismatic. He was a transfer student along with Yuki, and introduces himself as an alien, which people think is a joke due to his enthusiastic behaviour, although there are some indictations that may prove it true. He is seen carrying a fish in a fish bowl on his head, who refers to Haru as "brother". When upset with people's actions, he shoots them with a bright green water pistol, making it possible for him to briefly control their actions. Haru and his sister are on a secret mission on Earth to save it, and for some reason, they need Yuki to learn to fish in order to accomplish it. He is able to telepathically communicate with his sister via water. Later it is revealed that both Haru and his sister are fish beings from another world, with the mission of capturing one of their kind who is threatening the people of Enoshima with its mind control powers, thus Haru needs someone to fish it while he nullifies its powers with his own.

A native of Enoshima, Natsuki has black hair and glasses, with a generally irritated expression. He doesn't seem to like interacting with many people but is well known for his participation in national fishing competitions, resulting in the nickname, "Fishing Prince". By Haru and Yuki's insistence, he ends up teaching them to fish, soon becoming close friends with them. He has a soft spot for his younger sister, Sakura, his entire demeanor changing when talking with her.

A mysterious and stoic Indian man, always accompanied by his duck named Tapioca. He and his servants spy on Haru under orders of the mysterious organization called "DUCK" (an acronym for Defensive Universal Confidential Keepers). To further investigate Haru, Akira transfers into Yuki's class, despite being 25 years old, and ends up joining Yuki and the others in their fishing activities. He is also an experienced fisherman.

Secondary characters

Yuki's grandmother. She's French, and has a warm and cheerful personality. She allowed Haru to live with her and Yuki. She often gives Haru advice concerning his relationship with Yuki and human social interactions. She works at the Samuel Cocking Garden in Enoshima.

Haru's little sister. She also shoots people with a water pistol shaped like a dolphin, making it also possible for her to briefly control their actions. She has some doubts if Yuki will be able to help with their mission, despite Haru's insistence that he is the perfect choice. She is occasionally shown to appear as a fish.

He is the captain of a fishing boat called Seishunmaru. He has a crush on Misaki.

Shopkeeper in the fishing shop called "Hemingway".

Natsuki and Sakura's father. Him and Natsuki have a strained relationship. It's slightly hinted that this is because Natsuki is unhappy that his father is falling in love with another woman.

Natsuki's little sister, whom Natsuki is very fond of.

She's in the same class as four main characters and sits next to Yuki. In episode 6 it is revealed that she is the granddaughter of the town's mayor. She is also related to the Usami family.

An alien, the same type as Haru and his sister. He has long blue and pink hair. Referred as the JFX, the one who was possessing people. The main cause of the alien problem. He is quite shy.

Broadcast
The anime began airing on the noitamina block on Fuji TV on April 12, 2012 and ended on June 28, 2012. The anime's opening theme was "Tsurezure Monochrome" by Fujifabric, while the ending theme was "Sora mo Toberu Hazu" by sayonara ponytail. Aniplex released the series on DVD/Blu-ray in six volumes from June 27, 2012 to November 11, 2012. Section23 Films released the entire series on Blu-ray and DVD on August 20, 2013.

Episodes

References

External links
  
 

2012 anime television series debuts
A-1 Pictures
Anime with original screenplays
Aniplex
Comedy anime and manga
Fishing in anime and manga
Noitamina
Sentai Filmworks
Science fiction anime and manga
Television shows set in Japan
Extraterrestrials in anime and manga